is a female Japanese singer and songwriter from Iwate Prefecture. She has performed for songs for games and anime, such as Mizuiro, Please Twins!, Green Green, and the Galaxy Angel games. She has also written songs for other artists. Prior to December 10, 2005, her name was written as 佐藤裕美. She is affiliated with ARIA Entertainment and their composing group Elements Garden. She runs the company S Inc.

Biography 
During the 1990s, Hiromi Sato sang and played keyboard as part of the indies band Satyagraha. The band recorded only one album Park, before disbanding in 2000. Sato made her solo singing debut in 2000 with the song "Shield", ending theme for the PC game Kanaria: Kono omoi o uta ni nosete by Front Wing. In October 2001 she released her first major debut album, Looking for sign, a collection of game theme songs she had performed. She started performing theme songs for TV anime in 2003, where she performed the opening theme for the TV anime adaptation of Green Green, "Guri Guri", and the opening theme for Onegai Twins, "Second Flight", which was a duet with Kotoko. The "Second Flight" single reached number 15 on the Oricon charts, charting for 16 weeks. She had her first voice-acting role in the 2005 TV anime Sousei no Aquarion as Rena Rune.

In May 2007, Sato started her own company S Inc., a talent management and music production agency.

Discography

Albums

Singles

Filmography

References

External links 
  
 S inc. official site 
 Hiromi Sato at Oricon 

Anime musicians
Living people
Musicians from Iwate Prefecture
Video game musicians
1970 births
21st-century Japanese singers
21st-century Japanese women singers